Michele Pasinato (13 March 1969 – 8 April 2021) was an Italian volleyball player, who earned a total number of 256 caps for the Men's National Team in the 1990s. Nicknamed Paso and Micky he was on the side that won the title at the 1998 World Championships in Japan.

References

External links
 Profile

1969 births
2021 deaths
People from Cittadella
Italian men's volleyball players
Volleyball players at the 1992 Summer Olympics
Olympic volleyball players of Italy
Sportspeople from the Province of Padua